Erik Rebstock (born July 29, 1987) is a German sprint canoer who has been competing since the late 2000s. He won two medals in the C-4 1000 m event at the ICF Canoe Sprint World Championships with a silver in 2009 and a bronze in 2010.

References
Canoe09.ca profile

1987 births
German male canoeists
Living people
ICF Canoe Sprint World Championships medalists in Canadian